The Prince of Leonforte (Italian: Principe di Leonforte) is a noble title in Italy held by the House of Borghese, and previously by the families Branciforte and Lanza. The title derives its name from Leonforte, a town in Sicily. Indeed, the town gained its name from  the coat of arms of the Branciforte, depicting a strong lion (Italian: Leone Forte). It was originally created in 1614, during Philip III of Spain's reign as King of Naples for Nicolò Placido Branciforte. The title remained in the family until 1812, when Stefania Branciforte married Giuseppe Lanza Prince of Trabia. The family was thereafter known as Lanza Branciforte. The title was recognized by the Kingdom of Italy after the unification of Italy. In 1927, Sofia Lanza Branciforte, who was married to Don Giangiacomo Borghese, later Governor of Rome, was granted the title by Ministerial Decree. The title was thereafter used by her descendants, who are members of the House of Borghese.

House of Branciforte, 1614–1812

House of Lanza Branciforte, 1812–1927

House of Borghese, 1927–present

References

House of Borghese
Italian nobility